José Bénazéraf (8 January 1922 – 1 December 2012) was a French filmmaker and producer who specialised in erotic films.

Life and career

Bénazéraf was born in Casablanca, French Morocco on 8 January 1922.  After completing his studies in political sciences, he started his film career in 1958 producing Les lavandières du Portugal, a film by Pierre Gaspard-Huit, and went on to direct and write numerous erotic films in the 1960s. He started to direct erotic feature films in 1961 with L'éternité pour nous.

At the end of the 1970s, he moved his attention to the direct-to-video market.

He died in Chiclana de la Frontera.

Views on filmmaking
In 1973, Bénazéraf stated he did not make message films, and that one of the reasons he made films was to "disturb the French" (French: "déranger les Français"), who were, he felt, not disturbed by anything, neither politically nor sexually.

Bénazéraf also said that he attempted "to poeticise eroticism" (French: poétiser l'érotisme), whereas many at that time tended to accentuate pornography. He found pornographic films "horribly sad" (French: "horriblement triste") and called them "anti-eroticism" (French: "anti-érotisme"). According to Bénazéraf, eroticism was something "which creates a climate, which creates, which awakes, which sublimises desire" (French: "qui crée un climat, qui crée, qui suscite, qui sublimise le désir"), and the effect of pornography was the opposite.

Filmography

As director
 1960 : Mourir d'amour (Ma mort a les yeux bleus)
 1961 : Le Quatrième Sexe (not credited)
 1961 : L'Éternité pour nous (Le Cri de la chair)
 1962 : Le Concerto de la peur (La Drogue du vice) (U.S. title Night of Lust)
 1963 : Paris erotika (24 heures d'un Américain à Paris)
 1964 : Cover Girls
 1964 : L'Enfer dans la peau (La Nuit la plus longue)
 1965 : L'Enfer sur la plage
 1967 : Un épais manteau de sang
 1967 :  (St. Pauli zwischen Nacht und Morgen)
 1968 :  (Joe Caligula)
 1969 : Le Désirable et le Sublime
 1971 : Frustration (Les Dérèglements d'une jeune provinciale)
 1973 : Bacchanales 73
 1973 : The French Love
 1973 : Le Sexe nu (Un homme se penche sur son destin)
 1974 : Le Bordel, 1ère époque : 1900
 1974 : L'Homme qui voulait violer le monde (Black Love)
 1974 : Adolescence pervertie
 1975 : La Soubrette perverse (La Soubrette)
 1975 : La Veuve lubrique (La Veuve)
 1975 : Les Deux gouines (Les Gouines) (Victoire et Isabelle)
 1975 : Séquences interdites
 1975 : Les Incestueuses
 1976 : La Planque 1 (Sex Porno)
 1976 : La Planque 2
 1976 : Une garce en chaleur
 1977 : Un dîner très spécial
 1977 : La Bonne auberge (Ici, on baise)
 1977 : Miss Aubépine (Vices cachés de Miss Aubépine)
 1978 : Bordel SS
 1978 : Ouvre-toi
 1978 : Grimpe-moi dessus et fais-moi mal
 1978 : Baisez-moi partout (Attention, je vais jouir)
 1979 : Nicole par dessus, par dessous
 1979 : Anna cuisses entrouvertes
 1979 : Je te suce, tu me suces, il nous...
 1980 : Hurlements d'extase
 1980 : Amours d'adolescentes pubères
 1981 : Brantôme 81 : Vie de dames galantes
 1982 : Patricia, Valéria, Anna et les autres
 1983 : Eva la grande suceuse
 1983 : Chattes chaudes sur queues brûlantes
 1983 : La Madone des pipes
 1983 : La star sodomisée (The Movie Star)
 1983 : Le Majordome est bien monté
 1983 : Rita la vicieuse
 1983 : L'Espionne s'envoie en l'air
 1983 : Le Viol à bicyclette
 1983 : Je mouille aussi par derrière
 1983 : Je te suce, tu me suces ou la vie d'un bordel de province
 1984 : Du foutre plein le cul
 1984 : Petits culs à enfiler
 1984 : Les Sexologues en chaleur
 1984 : Le Port aux putes
 1984 : L'Antiquaire a la chatte mouillée
 1984 : Ingrid, Whore of Hamburg
 1985 : Perverse Isabelle (La Fête à Isabelle)
 1985 : Le Yacht des partouzes
 1985 : L'Éveil porno d'une star
 1985 : Le Cul des mille plaisirs
 1985 : Lady Winter, perversités à l'anglaise
 1985 : Olynka, grande prêtresse de l'amour
 1985 : Bourgeoises à soldats, soumises et défoncées
 1985 : Les Confidences pornographiques de lady Winter
 1985 : Voyage au bout du vice
 1985 : Spanish Fly
 1986 : Les Obsessions sexuelles de lady Winter
 1986 : Triple pénétration
 1986 : Sex Resort
 1986 : Passionate Pupils
 1986 : Naughty French Fantasies
 1986 : Hot Patutti
 1986 : Fantasies of a Married Woman
 1986 : Bedside Manor
 1990 : Backdoor to Paris
 1997 : Contes de la Folie Ordinaire
 1999 : Portrait Regards de Zarah Whites

As actor
 1960 : À bout de souffle (not credited)
 1971 : Frustration ou les Dérèglements d'une jeune provinciale

Bibliography

References

Further reading
 The book Immoral Tales: European Sex & Horror Movies 1956-1984 (1994) by Cathal Tohill and Pete Tombs dedicates a chapter to him.

External links
 Artist's website
 

1922 births
2012 deaths
French film directors
French pornographic film directors